Christopher Charles Stamey (born December 6, 1954) is an American musician, singer, songwriter, and record producer. After a brief time playing with Alex Chilton, as well as Mitch Easter under the name Sneakers, Stamey formed The dB's with Peter Holsapple.

Early life
Stamey was born in Chapel Hill, North Carolina, United States. He grew up in Winston-Salem, North Carolina, and graduated from R. J. Reynolds High School.He attended the University of North Carolina before transferring to New York University, where he graduated with a degree in philosophy.

Career
In 1977, Stamey founded the independent New York City record label, Car Records, which released the 1978 Chris Bell single with the tracks "I Am The Cosmos" and "You And Your Sister".

Stamey recorded and released two critically acclaimed albums with The dB's, Stands for Decibels (1981) and Repercussion (1982), which were initially released only in the UK, before leaving the band to pursue a solo career.

In 1991, Stamey and Holsapple reunited to record the album, Mavericks, which led to live concerts in London, England.

In 1996, Stamey moved back to Chapel Hill, North Carolina, and opened the recording studio, Modern Recording, with former dB's producer Scott Litt. He has worked as a producer and sound engineer for various artists and recording projects including those by the alternative country group Whiskeytown.

In 2004, Stamey released the album Travels in the South, quickly followed by V.O.T.E. 2004, enlarged as 2005's A Question of Temperature featuring the group Yo La Tengo as the album's backing musicians.

In July 2009, Stamey and Holsapple released their second album as a duo entitled Here and Now, which was promoted by a follow-up concert tour.

In 2012, Stamey reunited with the dB's to complete Falling Off the Sky, their first new studio album in 25 years and their first in 30 years with the original 1978 line-up.

On February 5, 2013, Stamey released the solo album Lovesick Blues on Yep Roc Records, followed by Euphoria in 2015.

Discography

Solo albums
 1982: It's a Wonderful Life (DB records)
 1987: It's Alright (A&M)
 1991: Fireworks (New Rose)
 2004: Travels in the South (Yep Roc)
 2013: Lovesick Blues (Yep Roc)
 2015: Euphoria (Yep Roc)
 2019: New Songs For The 20th Century w the Modrec Orchestra (Omnivore Recordings)
 2020: A Brand-New Shade of Blue w the Fellow Travelers (Omnivore Recordings)

Singles
 1977: "The Summer Sun" (Ork Records)
 1983: "Winter of Love" (Albion)
 1987: "Cara Lee" (A&M)
 1992: "On the Radio" (Intercord)
 1993: "Alive" (Singles Only)
 1994: "Let It Be Me" (Car Records)
 2018: "Greensboro Days"  (ShangMoto Songs BMI)

EPs
 1984: Instant Excitement (Coyote)

As a member of the dB's
 1981: Stands for Decibels (Albion)
 1983: Repercussion (Albion)
 2012: Falling Off the Sky (BarNone)
 2021: I Thought You Wanted to Know 1979-1981 (Propeller Sound Recordings)

As Chris Stamey and Friends
 1993: Christmas Time various artists (East Side Records)
 2015: Christmas Time Again various artists (Omnivore Recordings)

With Kirk Ross
 1995: The Robust Beauty of Improper Linear Models in Decision Making (East Side Digital)
 2021: The Robust Beauty of Improper Linear Models in Decision Making Remastered Editions, Vol. I, II (Modern Recording)

With Peter Holsapple
Albums
 1991: Mavericks (New Rose)
 2009: Here and Now (Yep Roc)
 2020: Our Back Pages (Omnivore Recordings)

Singles
 1991: "Angels" (New Rose)
 2009: "My Friend the Sun" (BarNone)
 2009: "Live at Euclid" (Euclid Records)

With Yo La Tengo
 2004: V.O.T.E. (Yep Roc); reissued and expanded as A Question of Temperature in 2005

As producer
 1983: Pylon - Chomp (DB Records)
 1990: Peter Blegvad - King Strut and Other Stories (Silvertone)
 1995: Whiskeytown - Faithless Street (Outpost)
 1997: Whiskeytown - Strangers Almanac (Outpost)
 1998: Myra Holder - Four Mile Road (Coyote)
 1999: Le Tigre - Le Tigre (Mr. Lady)
 1999: The Butchies - Population: 1975 (Mr. Lady)
 2000: Sue Garner & Rick Brown - Still (Thrill Jockey)
 2001: Alejandro Escovedo - A Man Under the Influence (Bloodshot)
 2001: Hazeldine - Double Back (Glitterhouse)
 2001: Le Tigre - Feminist Sweepstakes (Mr. Lady)
 2002: The Mayflies USA - Summertown (Yep Roc)
 2003: Caitlin Cary - I'm Staying Out (Yep Roc)
 2004: Tres Chicas - Sweetwater (Yep Roc)

As contributing musician
 1989: Syd Straw - Surprise (Virgin)
 1985: The Golden Palominos - Visions of Excess (Celluloid)
 1986: The Golden Palominos - Blast of Silence (Axed My Baby for a Nickel) (Celluloid)
 1992: Freedy Johnston - Can You Fly (BarNone))
 2015: Alex Chilton - Ocean Club '77 (Norton)

References

External links
 
 
 

1954 births
Living people
American rock guitarists
American male guitarists
American rock songwriters
People from Chapel Hill, North Carolina
The Golden Palominos members
20th-century American guitarists
20th-century American male musicians